Danielle Amina Cuttino (born June 22, 1996) is an American volleyball player who plays as an opposite hitter for the United States women's national volleyball team and Japanese professional team Toyota Auto Body Queenseis.

Early life

Cuttino is from Indianapolis, Indiana and attended high school at Ben Davis High School. She was a U.S. Junior National team member and was considered the tenth ranked recruit in her graduating class. She also played basketball in high school where she as an all-state honoree.

Career

College

Cuttino played as an outside hitter before moving to middle blocker at Purdue. She was named on the Big Ten All-Freshman team in 2014 and was an AVCA First Team All-American as a senior in 2017.

Professional clubs

  Casalmaggiore (2018–2020)
  Minas (2020–2022)
  Toyota Auto Body Queenseis (2022–present)

USA National Team 

Cuttino joined the national team in 2019 and won a gold medal at the 2019 Women's Pan-American Volleyball Cup. She was the captain and won a bronze medal at the 2021 Women's Pan-American Volleyball Cup, with a team leading 15 points in the bronze medal match. 

She was named to the roster for the  2022 National League tournament. She had 10 kills, two blocks and seven digs in a win against Bulgaria. In a win vs. China, she tallied eight points on seven kills and one block.

Awards and honors

Clubs

 2021–2022 South American Club Championships –  Gold medal, with Minas
 2021–2022 Superliga –  Gold medal, with Minas
 2021–2022 Mineiro Championship –  Silver medal, with Minas
 2021–2022 Brazilian Super Cup –  Silver medal, with Minas
 2021–2022 Brazilian Cup –  Silver medal, with Minas
 2020–2021 South American Club Championships –  Silver medal, with Minas
 2020–2021 Brazilian Cup –  Gold medal, with Minas
 2020–2021 Mineiro Championbship –  Gold medal, with Minas
 2020–2021 Troféu Super Vôlei –  Bronze medal, with Minas
 2020–2021 Superliga –  Gold medal, with Minas

College

AVCA First Team All-American (2017)

External links
 Team USA profile

References

1996 births
Living people
Sportspeople from Indianapolis
Middle blockers
Opposite hitters
Outside hitters
American women's volleyball players
Purdue Boilermakers women's volleyball players
American expatriate sportspeople in Brazil
American expatriate sportspeople in Japan
American expatriate sportspeople in Italy
Expatriate volleyball players in Italy
Expatriate volleyball players in Brazil
Expatriate volleyball players in Japan
Serie A1 (women's volleyball) players